The Agate Desert is a prairie located near White City, Oregon,  of which is protected as the Agate Desert Preserve. The area is not in fact a desert as its name suggests; it is so named because of the abundance of agate, petrified wood, jasper, and other minerals found there. Much of the World War II army training base of Camp White was built in the Agate Desert. The Nature Conservancy is working to preserve the Agate Desert as a native Rogue River Valley grassland.

Ecosystem

The area contains seasonal vernal pools that act as their own self-sufficient ecosystems. When the pools have dried up in the late spring, rings of wildflowers bloom in their place and the various plants and animals enter a period of dormancy until the next spring. The pools contain a rare species of fairy shrimp. The Agate Desert is also the only known place where the endangered big-flowered woolly meadowfoam plants grow and the desert contains over 500 of the plants. Cook's lomatium or Cook's Desert Parsley is also found in the Agate Desert and only grows naturally elsewhere in the French Flat of Illinois Valley, also in Oregon. In 1998, Henri Dumont discovered a new species, Dumontia oregonensis, also known as the Hairy Water Flea, in the desert, and it is not known to live anywhere else.

Preservation 
Ecologists are currently conducting prescribed burns to the area, and volunteers are then spreading seeds of the native grasses and wildflowers in order to restore them to the area. Ecologists are also studying the various species, many of them rare, in the vernal pools. Development in the valley has left it at only about 25% of its original size.

References

External links
U.S. Fish and Wildlife Service
The Nature Conservancy's Agate Desert Preserve 
EIS on threatened and endangered species in the Agate Desert 
Agate Desert Lomatium (Agate Desert Parsley)
Oak fungus in the Agate Desert
Whetstone Savanna
Fairy shrimp

Grasslands of Oregon
White City, Oregon
Geography of Jackson County, Oregon
Protected areas of Jackson County, Oregon
Nature Conservancy preserves